The Palm Springs International Festival of Short Films (a.k.a. Palm Springs International ShortFest) held annually in Palm Springs, California is the largest film festival for short films in the United States.

The Palm Springs International Festival of Short Films takes place across seven days each June, showing more than 350 short films every year, and hosting a Short Film Market with over 3,000 new short films annually. It also presents a three-day program of seminars, master classes, panels and roundtable discussions with free admission for all filmmaking and industry guests. An AMPAS qualifying Festival, PSISF has hosted 97 short films in its 19-year history that went on to secure Oscar nominations in the short film categories.

The Festival of Short Films is a spin-off of the Palm Springs International Film Festival (PSIFF) that takes place each January.

In 2021 the main PSIFF festival was not held due to the COVID-19 pandemic, but the ShortFest went ahead on June 22-28.

As of December 2021, the next event was scheduled for June 21–27, 2022.

References

External links

Palm Springs, California
Film festivals in California
Short film festivals in the United States
Annual events in Riverside County, California